Deltex E3 ubiquitin ligase 4 is a protein that in humans is encoded by the DTX4 gene.

References

Further reading